Micratelodesmis minor is a species of beetle in the family Cerambycidae, and the only species in the genus Micratelodesmis. It was described by Martins and Galileo in 2012. It is known from Costa Rica.

References

Lamiinae
Beetles described in 2012
Monotypic beetle genera